Unpretty Rapstar 2 is a 2015 South Korean music competition program focusing on female rappers. It is the second season of Unpretty Rapstar, which premiered in January 2015 on Mnet and was hosted by Korean rapper San E. It is a spin-off of Show Me the Money.

Contestants
Winner:  Truedy (Signed with MNET before show, SMTM6 contestant)
First runner-up: KittiB (rapper signed with Brand New Music after the show ended)
Second runner-up:  Hyolyn (former Sistar member)
Third runner-up:  Moon Sua (former YG Entertainment Trainee. Now member of Billlie under Mystic Story)

Semi-finalists:
 Heize (Now with P Nation)
 Yubin (former Wonder Girls member)
 Jeon Jiyoon (former 4Minute member) (Joined in episode 4)
Yezi (former Fiestar member)

Eliminated contestants: 

Kasper (former Play the Siren member, SMTM4 and SMTM6 contestant) (Eliminated in episode 8)
 Exy of Cosmic Girls (Joined in episode 6, eliminated in episode 8)
 Kim of Rubber Soul, (The Unit contestant) (Joined in episode 6, eliminated in episode 7)
 Gilme of Clover (Eliminated in episode 5)
 Ahn Soo Min (SMTM4 contestant) (Eliminated in episode 3)
 Ash-B (Unpretty Rapstar 3 contestant, SMTM5 contestant) (Eliminated in episode 3)

Discography

References

External links
 

2
2015 South Korean television series debuts
2015 South Korean television series endings
Korean-language television shows
South Korean music television shows
Mnet (TV channel) original programming
Hip hop television